PCTP may refer to:
PCTP (gene)
Phosphatidylcholine transfer protein
 Portuguese Workers' Communist Party